Richard Ray Larsen (born June 15, 1965) is an American politician and lobbyist serving as the United States representative for  since 2001. A member of the Democratic Party, Larsen is the ranking member of the House Transportation and Infrastructure Committee.

Early life, education and career

Larsen was born and raised in Arlington, Washington, and graduated from Arlington High School. Throughout his childhood, he played youth soccer and was later a ball boy for the original Seattle Sounders. Larsen attended Pacific Lutheran University and the University of Minnesota, earning a master's degree in public affairs. He formerly worked as director of public affairs for the Washington State Dental Association and as a lobbyist for the dental profession.

U.S. House of Representatives

Committee assignments
 Committee on Transportation and Infrastructure (Ranking Member)
 Subcommittee on Aviation

Caucus memberships
 U.S.-China Working Group
 School Safety Caucus
 Caucus to Fight and Control Methamphetamine
 Congressional Arts Caucus
 Congressional Puget Sound Recovery Caucus
 Congressional NextGen 9-1-1 Caucus
U.S.-Japan Caucus
Congressional Solar Caucus
New Democrat Coalition
APEC Caucus (Co-Chair)
Congressional Arctic Working Group (Co-Chair)
Soccer Caucus (Co-Chair)

Political positions

In 2006, CQPolitics wrote:

Larsen, a member of the centrist New Democrat Coalition in the House, has carved an image as a moderate that appeals to crucial swing voters in the politically competitive coastal district in the northwestern corner of Washington State. He still maintains support from centers surrounding the port cities of Everett and Bellingham.

In 2005, The American Prospect characterized Washington's 2nd congressional district as "traditionally Democratic" and contrasted that with Larsen's voting record at the time:

Larsen won this traditionally Democratic district last year almost 2 to 1. Yet Larsen's voting record doesn't reflect these numbers: He voted in favor of the bankruptcy bill crafted by the credit-card industry, the Bush administration's estate-tax repeal, and the tort "reform" bill supported by the U.S. Chamber of Commerce limiting the right to sue.

Larsen currently sits on the Transportation and Infrastructure Committee and formerly sat on the Armed Services Committee. Consequently, he has fundraised $1.26 million from political action committees affiliated with the transportation industry and $560,000 from political action committees affiliated with the defense industry.

Abortion
Planned Parenthood, National Family Planning & Reproductive Health Association and NARAL Pro-Choice America have all highly rated Larsen's position on abortion. He has voted against several bills that would restrict abortion rights. In 2022, Larsen reaffirmed his support for abortion rights and their protections under Roe v. Wade, saying he would "continue to stand with women and advocates in Washington state and across the country to ensure a woman’s right to access safe reproductive health care."

Environment
Larsen voted for the 2009 American Clean Energy and Security Act known as "cap and trade". He has cosponsored legislation that would create the Wild Sky Wilderness area in his home district and is a member of the Congressional Wildlife Refuge Caucus.

On February 8, 2019, Larsen came out in opposition to the Green New Deal, saying:

I am not ready to support the Green New Deal resolution. It is difficult to support the resolution right now when one of the lead sponsors says one of the intentions is to make air travel unnecessary.

In 2020, Fuse Washington in its Progressive Voters Guide noted that Larsen does not support the Green New Deal and accepted political contributions from corporations including Exxon Mobil "as recently as last year".

Healthcare reform
Larsen has supported the House Democratic proposal for the Affordable Care Act. He voted for the reform bill in November 2009. Larsen does not support single-payer health insurance. He has said he "thought it was more appropriate to stick with defending Obamacare, not to change in the middle of the controversy".

Larsen does not support Medicare for All and has said he supports the Public Option Deficit Reduction Act as an alternative. This proposal adds a public option to the Affordable Care Act using the same market-based exchanges while lowering premiums by only five to seven percent.

Impeachment
In 2007, Larsen opposed impeaching President George W. Bush, saying, "I believe the American people elected a Democratic majority to make positive changes in their lives. If we took up impeachment, we would do nothing else for the next 2 years. I don't think that's what we were elected to do". Larsen supported impeaching President Donald J. Trump on July 18, 2019.

Iraq War
Although Larsen initially voted against a bill authorizing military force in Iraq in October 2002, he also voted against an amendment that sought to have the United States work through the United Nations to resolve tensions instead of invading Iraq. In 2006, Larsen voted against requiring Congressional authorization for use of force in Iran, and in 2011 he voted for use of force in Libya.

Since 2002, Larsen has voted for nearly every bill put forth in the House concerning the wars in Iraq and Afghanistan. In 2006, the Seattle Post-Intelligencer described Larsen as a "strong advocate for providing money to support the [Iraq War]".

In 2006, Larsen voted to endorse the War in Iraq and against a mandated withdrawal plan. In 2008, he said that troops would be in Iraq "well into the next administration" and likely remain "for another 10 years". Larsen supported President Obama's proposed exit strategy, which promised to remove combat troops by summer of 2010.

Labor
Larsen voted for the S-Miner Act and Extending Federal Emergency Unemployment Benefits and Providing Business and Homebuyer Tax Credits bill. He showed support for the interests of the Utility Workers Union of America, Service Employees International Union, American Federation of State, County & Municipal Employees, and AFL–CIO. He claims to support Washington State's economy by investing in small- to medium-size businesses to help them succeed in the global economy.

In January 2014, Larsen faced criticism from the International Association of Machinists and Aerospace Workers for supporting Boeing's proposal to replace pensions with a 401(k)-style retirement plan.

Transportation
As a member of the House Transportation and Infrastructure Committee, Larsen has voted for every transportation bill since being reelected in 2008. He believes that "sound investments in transportation keep our economy moving" and improve conditions in other areas. Larsen was one of 79 cosponsors of the SAFETEA-LU bill to improve highways, increase funding for ferry systems, and expedite the flow of traffic and goods through border crossings.

Political campaigns

2006

Larsen defeated Republican Doug Roulstone, a retired Navy officer from Snohomish, with 65% of the vote to Roulstone's 34%.

2008

Larsen was challenged in the Democratic primary during his 2008 reelection campaign by perennial candidate Glen Johnson. His Republican opponent for the House race was recently retired Snohomish County Sheriff Rick Bart.

For the 2008 election cycle, Larsen's campaign's total income was $1,336,438. His campaign spent $1,155,691. The companies that contributed the most money were Boeing Co., Microsoft Corp., American Dental Assn., McBee Strategic Consulting, and Puget Energy. The labor, finance/insurance/real estate, transportation, misc. business, and health sectors were the largest contributing sectors. The major industry donations came from health professionals, transportation unions, building trade unions, retired, and sea transport.

2010

Larsen narrowly defeated Republican nominee John Koster to win a sixth term.

Larsen was endorsed by the Seattle Post-Intelligencer on October 13, 2010.

2012

In 2012, Larsen won reelection with 61% of the vote to Republican nominee Dan Matthews's 39%.

2016 
Larsen was challenged by Republican Marc Hennemann. Hennemann decided to challenge Larsen after receiving an answer he disliked to a question at a town hall meeting in Coupeville. Larsen defeated Hennemann, 64% to 36%.

Electoral history

References

External links

 Congressman Rick Larsen official U.S. House website
 Rick Larsen for Congress
 

 

|-

1965 births
21st-century American politicians
American Methodists
Methodists from Washington (state)
Democratic Party members of the United States House of Representatives from Washington (state)
Snohomish County Councillors
Living people
Pacific Lutheran University alumni
People from Arlington, Washington
Protestants from Washington (state)
Humphrey School of Public Affairs alumni